Final league standings for the 1927-28 St. Louis Soccer League.

League standings

Top Goal Scorers

External links
St. Louis Soccer Leagues (RSSSF)
The Year in American Soccer - 1928

1927-28
1927–28 domestic association football leagues
1927–28 in American soccer
St Louis Soccer
St Louis Soccer